Peter Toohey (born 20 April 1954) is a former Australian cricketer who played in 15 Test matches and five One Day Internationals between 1977 and 1979.

Toohey was one of the cricketers who came to the fore when the bulk of Australia's top cricketers defected to Kerry Packer's World Series Cricket. During his prime playing years in the Australian Test team, some media commentators referred to Toohey as "Australia's master batsman", such was Toohey's pivotal role in the Australian team during the absence of the World Series players.

When the World Series Cricket players returned to mainstream Test cricket in 1979–80, Toohey only played two more Tests, both in the summer of 1979–80. He retired from cricket and now works in the financial sector in Brisbane.

Career
Toohey was born in Blayney, New South Wales, and played cricket for St Stanislaus' College in Bathurst, New South Wales. He toured New Zealand with Western Districts Colts and played for New South Wales Schoolboys before his first-class debut for New South Wales against Queensland in 1974–75.

Test Player
During the 1977–78 season, defections to World Series Cricket saw opportunities open up for Australian cricketers. Toohey was selected for the first Test against India and played all five Tests that series.

He was one of the standout performers on the 1978 tour of the West Indies.

Toohey was dropped from the Australian side during the 1978–79 Ashes.

He was overlooked for the 1979 tour to India.

Toohey's form declined during the 1983–84 season and he was dropped from the NSW side. He eventually retired from first class cricket in May 1984.

References

1954 births
Living people
Australia Test cricketers
Australia One Day International cricketers
New South Wales cricketers
Australian cricketers
Cricketers from New South Wales